Cyclacanthus is a genus of flowering plants in the family Acanthaceae and tribe Justicieae.  The genus consists of two species found in south-east Asia, described by Spencer Le Marchant Moore.

Species
Cyclacanthus coccineus S.Moore
Cyclacanthus poilanei Benoist (see external link)

References

External links
 
 Động thực vật Việt Nam: Cyclacanthus poilanei Benoist (retrieved 29 November 2017)

Acanthaceae genera
Acanthaceae
Flora of Indo-China